Jaar (Arabic: جعار Jaʿār) is a small town and capital of Khanfir District in south-western Yemen. One of the largest settlements in the Abyan Governorate, it is located in the south of the Abyan Governorate to the north of Al Kawd and the regional capital of Zinjibar. The town is located about 2 kilometres east of the right bank of the Wadi Bana.

Khanfar is a southern suburb of the town, noted for its ceramics and munitions production, and on March 28, 2011, an explosion occurred.

The town was controlled by Ansar al-Sharia, a group affiliated with al-Qaeda, from March 2011 to June 2012. However, on 12 June 2012, the Yemeni Army retook control of Jaar along with Zinjibar. On 2 December 2015, Ansar al-Sharia captured Jaar from Hadi government forces. Zinjibar was also captured the same day.

In early May 2016, AQAP fighters withdrew from the city of Zinjibar and Jaar after negotiation with Hadi loyalists. Since then, it has repeatedly withdrawn and returned. On 14 August 2016, the cities were fully captured by pro-government forces who dislodged the militants from them.

References

External links

Towns and villages in the Abyan Governorate

Populated places in Abyan Governorate
Towns in Yemen